Pontarddulais Town Association Football Club  is a Welsh football based in Pontarddulais, Swansea, Wales They play in the West Wales Premier League which is in the fourth tier of the Welsh football league system.

History

The club was formed in 1970, although there have also been previous sides including Pontarddulais Athletic.

For the 2020–21 season the club joined the newly formed tier 4 West Wales Premier League having previously played in the Carmarthenshire League Premier Division.

References

External links
Official club website
Official club twitter
Official club facebook

Football clubs in Wales
West Wales Premier League clubs
Carmarthenshire League clubs
Football clubs in Swansea
1970 establishments in Wales
Association football clubs established in 1970